高宗 may refer to several Chinese and Korean monarchs.
 See Gaozong (disambiguation) for Chinese monarchs
 See Gojong (disambiguation) for Korean monarchs